Steve Conte (January 16, 1920 – April 28, 1997) was an Italian-born American actor who immigrated with his family to the United States in the early 1920s.  He often played henchmen, thugs, and criminal types, besides playing ethnicities.  His career lasted nearly thirty-seven years in both film and television. He appeared in approximately fifty different television series and more than thirty films. He worked at least a half dozen times with B Grade director Jerry Warren.

Background
Conte was born in Gagliato, Italy. He came with his family via boat to New York. His adolescent years were spent in New York as well. During World War II, he was based in Europe as part of the United States Army Air Corps, the forerunner of the United States Air Force. After the war, he married his wife Shirley, by whom he had two children. Their marriage lasted until their divorce in the 1950s. In 1992, he was reunited with his son Steve, who was born in 1960 and placed for adoption. He died of Alzheimer's disease on April 28, 1997, at the age of 77. He was buried at Southern Nevada Veterans Memorial Cemetery.

As a character actor, he was able to have a good run of work for some time. Many of the roles that he played were of the rugged type.

Career

1950s
One of Conte's earliest roles was in 1950 as the road agent in "Shotgun Messenger", the first episode of The Marshal of Gunsight Pass. Also the same year he played Matt Riley in the Western film Gunfire. The following year he played the Apache kid in the "Ten Thousand Reward" episode of The Range Rider. Also that year he played Henchman Mac in Cattle Queen. In 1959, he played Whorf in Teenage Zombies.

In 1952, Conte was cast as a villain, Jerry, in the 1952 episode, "Self Made Man," of Death Valley Days.

1960s
In 1960, Conte guest starred in the M Squad episode, "The Man Who Lost His Brain".  He appeared that same year in Overland Trail in the episode, "All the O'Mara Horses." In 1962, he played Cabot in Terror of the Bloodhunters. In 1966, he appeared in The Wild World of Batwoman (1966).

1970s to 1980s
The early 1970s, Conte appeared in such films as The Gatling Gun in the role of Private Mitchell, and in the Sci-Fi The Resurrection of Zachary Wheeler as a radio operator. In the late 1970s, he played a prison guard in the Harold Becker-directed The Onion Field.

One of his last appearances is credited as an orderly in the Jeffrey Obrow/Stephen Carpenter-directed horror film, The Kindred, in 1987.

Role types

Thugs and criminals
Throughout Conte's career, he played some twenty-three roles as henchman thug, and criminal types.

He played the part of Henchman Mac in the 1951 film, Cattle Queen of Montana, starring Barbara Stanwyck and Ronald Reagan, and Henchman Lait in the television series, Hopalong Cassidy.

In 1954, Conte played a bandit in the Wild Luke's Boy episode of General Electric Theater. In 1955, he played a henchman in the Dick Ross directed film, Wiretapper, and Cyclops, "One-Eyed Henchman" in the Guns Below the Border episode of The Gene Autry Show. He had also played a henchman in two previous episodes of the show.  He played henchmen in three episodes of Batman which were, Penguin Is a Girl's Best Friend, Penguin Sets a Trend, and Penguin's Disastrous End.

Filmography (selective)

Television

Film

References

External links

 Aveleyman.com: Steve Conte
 

1920 births
1997 deaths
People from the Province of Catanzaro
People of Calabrian descent
20th-century American male actors
American male film actors
American male television actors
Italian emigrants to the United States
Burials at Southern Nevada Veterans Memorial Cemetery